Juan Danilo Bangayan Ulep, D.D. (born 24 June 1962), is a Filipino bishop of the Catholic Church. He is the fifth and current Bishop-Prelate of Batanes.

Biography
The Rev. Danilo B. Ulep was born in Tuguegarao City, Cagayan, in the Archdiocese of Tuguegarao, on 24 June 1962. He studied philosophy and theology at the Santo Tomas University in Manila, where he obtained a bachelor's degree in philosophy, theology and canon law, and a licentiate in philosophy.

He was ordained a priest for the Diocese of Tugugarao on 10 April 1987 at the St. Peter's Cathedral by Archbishop Diosdado Talamayan, then Archbishop of Tuguegarao.

He subsequently served as: vicar of the parish of San Vincenzo Ferrer, Solana, Cagayan (1987–1992); administrator of the same parish (1992–1993); pastor of the Holy Guardian Angels parish, Tuao, Cagayan (1993–1999); rector of the San Jacinto minor seminary of Alimannao, Cagayan and director of the commission for vocations and seminaries (1999–2005); pastor of the St. Joseph the Worker parish of San José, Baggao, and episcopal vicar of Alcala (2005–2011).

Finally, from 2011 up to the present, he has served as pastor and rector of the Santo Niño parish and shrine in San Gabriel, Tuguegarao City, Cagayan, director of the biblical apostolate and president of the priests’ assembly of the archdiocese of Tuguegarao.

On May 20, 2017, Pope Francis appointed him as the fifth bishop of the Territorial Prelature of Batanes following the resignation of Bishop Camilo D. Gregorio. He was consecrated bishop at St. Peter's Cathedral on July 29, 2017, by Archbishop Sergio Utleg, then Archbishop of Tuguegarao. Co-consecrators were Archbishop Marlo M. Peralta of Nueva Segovia and Bishop Camilo D. Gregorio, Bishop-Prelate Emeritus of Batanes. He was installed as Bishop-Prelate of Batanes on August 8 of the same year, feast of St. Dominic De Guzman, patron of Basco, the capital of Batanes.

Coat of arms
The coat of arms of the Prelature of Batanes appears on the left side of the viewer while that of Bishop Ulep appears on the right. Bishop Ulep's motto is taken from Matthew 6:10, Fiat voluntas tua ("Your will be done").

References

External links

  

Roman Catholic bishops of Tuguegarao
Filipino Roman Catholic bishops
University of Santo Tomas alumni
People from Cagayan
1952 births
Living people